Serdar Ortaç (born 16 February 1970) is a Turkish singer, songwriter and composer.
He is known as one of the most popular singers in Turkish pop-music history.

Personal life

Serdar Ortaç married Irish model Chloe Loughnan in 2014. Loughnan appeared in one of Serdar Ortaç videos and was a judge on the popular Turkish fashion show Bu Tarz Benim. The two divorced in August 2019.

Discography

Albums

Studio albums

Compilation albums

Remix albums

EPs

Live albums

Singles

Charts

Awards

References

External links
 

1970 births
Living people
Singers from Istanbul
Turkish folk-pop singers
Turkish pop singers
Turkish singer-songwriters
Turkish people of Tatar descent
21st-century Turkish singers
21st-century Turkish male singers
Turkish lyricists